BC Teuta Durrës is an Albanian basketball team that plays in the Albanian Basketball Superliga, the highest division in the Albanian Basketball League. The club was founded in 1925 as part of the multi disciplinary KS Teuta Durrës.

Domestic achievements 
Albanian Basketball League (4):
1947, 1955, 2021, 2022
 Runner-up (3):
2016, 2018, 2019
Albanian Basketball Cup (4):
1956, 1965, 2018-19, 2020-21
 Runner-up (2):
2016-17, 2017-18
Albanian Basketball Supercup (3):
2017-18, 2018-19, 2021-22
Albanian Basketball First Division (1):
2014-15
 Runner-up (1):
2004-05
Balkan League
 Runner-up (1):
2018–19

Players

Current roster

References

Teuta
Sport in Durrës
Basketball teams established in 1925